Penda Sylla (born 3 October 1990) is a Senegalese handball player for ASPTT Strasbourg and the Senegalese national team. 

She competed at the 2019 World Women's Handball Championship in Japan.

References

External links

1990 births
Living people
Senegalese female handball players
Sportspeople from Strasbourg
African Games medalists in handball
French female handball players
French sportspeople of Senegalese descent
20th-century Senegalese women
21st-century Senegalese women
African Games bronze medalists for Senegal
Competitors at the 2015 African Games